Johns Run is a  long 2nd order tributary to Sandy Creek in Halifax County, Virginia.

Course 
Johns Run rises about 0.25 miles south of Lucks, Virginia in Pittsylvania County and then flows southeast to join Sandy Creek about 1 mile northeast of Henrys Mill.

Watershed 
Johns Run drains  of area, receives about 45.6 in/year of precipitation, has a wetness index of 387.23, and is about 66% forested.

See also 
 List of Virginia Rivers

References 

Rivers of Halifax County, Virginia
Rivers of Pittsylvania County, Virginia
Rivers of Virginia